New Zealand Scholarship is a New Zealand secondary school award, awarded to a limited number of students, that provides financial support for study at a New Zealand university. It is awarded by assessing candidates against challenging standards through an examination or, in the case of some subjects, submission of a portfolio and/or report. Successful candidates have the potential to receive as much as $10,000 per year over three years depending on the class of award that they achieve. It is highly competitive as only 3% of the number of students studying a subject at NCEA Level 3 are able to achieve a passing grade on the scholarship assessment. New Zealand Scholarship is administered by the New Zealand Qualifications Authority (NZQA), alongside the National Certificate of Educational Achievement (NCEA). It is sometimes referred to as NCEA Level 4, sitting at Level 4 on the New Zealand Qualifications Framework. 

In 2020, 10,433 students were entered into New Zealand Scholarship assessments. There were 20,095 individual subject entries. Only 13,110 of these were marked and graded as some were absent or void. 2,151 students received a Scholarship award of some form.

History 
The first scholarship examination by the University of New Zealand was held in May 1872. After 1962, scholarships were awarded by the Universities Entrance Board. The New Zealand Qualifications Authority took over the work of the Universities Entrance Board in 1991.

From 1989 to 2003 scholarships were awarded to the top 3-4% of Bursary students. In response to the removal of separate scholarship examinations a group of teachers set up their own scholarship exam, later becoming the New Zealand Educational Scholarships Trust (NZEST).

A "NCEA Level 4" qualification was proposed in the 1998 Cabinet paper "Qualifications for Young People Aged 16 to 19 Years" and the discussions that ensued concluded that there be an external examination and that scholarships be awarded.  New Zealand Scholarship exams started in 2004. NZEST stopped its examinations and now provides financial assistance for students studying at NZ universities.

The 2004 examinations, in line with the NCEA, were criterion-referenced and produced some unexpected results distributions. Several reviews of the award and a media and political debate followed. The Scholarship examination was largely revamped. Scholarships in 2005 were awarded to the top three per cent of NCEA Level 3 candidates in the subject, given that examiners are satisfied a worthy standard has been met. Monetary awards were restructured and credit value was removed from the examinations.

Award 

The number of passing grades awarded in each scholarship subject is set at approximately 3% of the size of the Level 3 Cohort. The Level 3 Cohort is the number of students who achieve 14+ credits in the NCEA Level 3 equivalent of said subject. There are two types of passing grade, Scholarship (S) and Outstanding (O). A common misconception is that passing grades are only awarded to 3% of the students who sit the scholarship assessment, rather than 3% of the total Level 3 cohort. However, as evidenced by the ratio of entries to scholarship passes, the actual percentage of entries that pass is much higher than 3%. In 2020, for example, 37.2% of assessed entries received either an S or O passing grade in English, and 21% in Calculus.  

There are six classes of monetary award: 

The Premier Award is awarded to the very top 7 to 12 Candidates. The minimum eligibility requirement to be considered for this award is achievement of at least three Scholarships at "Outstanding" level in the same year. The number of recipients for this award is restricted and achieving the minimum requirement will not guarantee an award. It is worth $10,000 each year for up to three years for as long as the recipient maintains at least a 'B' grade average each year of their tertiary study.
An Outstanding Scholar Award is awarded to the next top 40 to 60 candidates. The minimum eligibility requirement to be considered for this award is achievement of three Scholarships including at least two at "Outstanding" level in the same year, or more than three Scholarships including at least one at "Outstanding" level in the same year. The number of recipients for this award is restricted and achieving the minimum requirement will not guarantee an award. It is worth $5,000 each year for up to three years for as long as the recipient maintains at least a 'B' grade average each year of their tertiary study.
A Scholarship Award is awarded to candidates who achieve New Zealand Scholarship in three or more subjects in the same year and for Candidates who achieve two Scholarships at "Outstanding" level in the same year. It is worth $2,000 each year for up to three years for as long as the recipient maintains at least a 'B' grade average each year of their tertiary study.
A Top Subject Scholar Award is awarded to the top Candidate in each one of the New Zealand Scholarship subjects. It is worth $2,000 each year for up to three years for as long as the recipient maintains at least a 'B' grade average each year of their tertiary study.
A Single Subject Award is awarded to candidates who achieve New Zealand Scholarship in one or more subjects. It is a 'one-off' award of $500 per subject, for up to two subjects, (maximum payment $1000). 
The Prime Minister's Award is awarded to the Candidate who has attained the best results of all Premier Award recipients, taking into account the number of New Zealand Scholarships achieved at "Outstanding" level, the number of additional New Zealand Scholarships achieved, and the ranking of Candidates within individual subjects.
Generally, students meeting the criteria for more than one award receive the award with the highest monetary value. However, students receiving a Top Subject Scholar Award, who also achieve Scholarship in another subject, also receive a Single Subject Award.

Assessment 
Scholarship subjects are assessed through a written exam lasting three hours, with some exceptions. Dance, Design, Design and Visual Communication, Music, Painting, Photography, Printmaking, and Sculpture are instead assessed through submission of portfolios of work. Health & Physical Education and Technology are instead assessed through submitted reports. Assessments for language subjects also involve recorded speaking; the same is true for Dance, Drama, and Music but with a recorded performance.

To be able to enter New Zealand Scholarship, students only have to be enrolled in a consented New Zealand secondary school. This means that, while it is usually Year 13 students who enter, some Year 12 students undertake Scholarship as well. Sometimes, Year 11 students also enter.

Subjects

References

See also
New Zealand Qualifications Authority (website) (awarding body)
New Zealand Educational Scholarships Trust
Press release 15 December 2003 detailing prizes

Education in New Zealand
Student financial aid